Narimanov (masculine) or Narimanova (feminine or masculine genitive) is the name of several inhabited localities in Russia.

Urban localities
Narimanov, Astrakhan Oblast, a town in Narimanovsky District of Astrakhan Oblast; 

Rural localities
Narimanov, Rostov Oblast, a khutor in Leninskoye Rural Settlement of Zimovnikovsky District of Rostov Oblast
Narimanova, a village in Narimanovsky Rural Okrug of Tyumensky District of Tyumen Oblast

See also
imeni Narimanova, Russia, a rural locality (a settlement) in Nurlatsky District of the Republic of Tatarstan